Pony Express Rider is a 1926 American silent Western film directed by Robert J. Horner and starring William Barrymore and Pauline Curley.

Cast
 William Barrymore as Bill Miller
 Pauline Curley

References

Bibliography
 Langman, Larry. A Guide to Silent Westerns. Greenwood Publishing Group, 1992.

External links
 

1926 films
1926 Western (genre) films
American black-and-white films
Films directed by Robert J. Horner
Silent American Western (genre) films
1920s English-language films
1920s American films